Ildikó Erdősi (born 14 September 1989) is a retired Hungarian handball player. She currently works as a physiotherapist at Dunaújvárosi Kohász KA.

References

1989 births
Living people
Hungarian female handball players
Sportspeople from Dunaújváros
Siófok KC players
21st-century Hungarian women